was a Japanese politician who served as the Minister for Foreign Affairs for a brief period in 1993.

Mutō was born in Kakamigahara in Gifu Prefecture in 1926. He studied at the Kyoto University. He was later elected to the House of Representatives of Japan.

Mutō founded and directed a minority studies group serving the Japanese government. Mutō replaced Michio Watanabe as Minister for Foreign Affairs. After his stint as Foreign Minister, Mutō would later hold positions at the Ministry of International Trade and Industry. He subsequently retired from politics in 2005.

In March 1993 he was appointed an Honorary Officer of the Order of Australia, for service to Australian/Japanese relations.

Death
Mutō died in a Tokyo hospital from pancreatic cancer on 4 November 2009, two weeks before his 83rd birthday.

References

|-

|-

|-

|-

 

 

1926 births
2009 deaths
Deaths from cancer in Japan
Foreign ministers of Japan
Government ministers of Japan
Members of the House of Representatives (Japan)
Deaths from pancreatic cancer
Politicians from Gifu Prefecture
Kyoto University alumni
Honorary Officers of the Order of Australia
21st-century Japanese politicians